Aeropuertos y Servicios Auxiliares (ASA) is a Mexican Federal Government-owned corporation with its own equity capital and legal identity. It has its headquarters in Mexico City in Venustiano Carranza, Mexico City. It was set up in June 1965 to oversee management, operations and development of Mexico's airports.  it operated 18 airports and part-operated another 5. It also provides aviation fuel at 63 locations.

Airports operated by ASA

Passenger numbers
Number of passengers at each airport by 2022:

See also 
List of the busiest airports in Mexico

References

External links
ASA Official Page

Airport operators of Mexico
Government-owned companies of Mexico
Government-owned transport companies
Companies based in Mexico City